Fārsnāma ("The Book of Fars") is a local  history and geography of Fars Province, Persia written during the Saljuq period (12th century). It is attributed to the otherwise unknown Ibn al-Balkhi, whose name indicates his father was from Balkh, Khorasan.

References

12th-century history books
Persian-language books
History of Fars Province
Geography of Fars Province
History books about Iran
Geography books
Culture of the Seljuk Empire